Gregory III served as Greek Patriarch of Alexandria between 1354 and 1366.

References

14th-century Patriarchs of Alexandria